German submarine U-988 was a Type VIIC U-boat built for Nazi Germany's Kriegsmarine for service during World War II.
She was laid down on 2 October 1942 by Blohm & Voss, Hamburg as yard number 188, launched on 3 June 1943 and commissioned on 15 July 1943 under Oberleutnant zur See Erich Dobberstein.

Design
German Type VIIC submarines were preceded by the shorter Type VIIB submarines. U-988 had a displacement of  when at the surface and  while submerged. She had two shafts and two  propellers.

U-988 was fitted with five  torpedo tubes (four fitted at the bow and one at the stern), fourteen torpedoes, one  SK C/35 naval gun, 220 rounds, and one twin  C/30 anti-aircraft gun. The boat had a complement of between forty-four and sixty.

Service history
U-988′s career began on 15 July 1943 with training as part of the 5th U-boat Flotilla. On 8 September 1943, she collided with U-983 in the Baltic Sea north of Loba. As a result of the collision, U-983 sank with the loss of five of her 43 crew.

U-988 began active service on 1 June 1944 as part of the 7th U-boat Flotilla.

Wolfpacks
U-988 took part in no wolfpacks.

Fate
U-988 was sunk by depth charges from a US Liberator on 22 June 1944. All hands lost after the attack.

Previously recorded fate
U-988 sent her last radio message on 18 June, informing about an air attack, and was lost with all hands thereafter, and her fate is not certain.

Alternate fate
There appeared however a theory, that U-988 could have been sunk after an attack of Polish Wellington Mk XIV from 304 Squadron, piloted by Leopold Antoniewicz, which was credited with sinking a submarine on 18 June in the approximate position . Then, the submarine sank on 29/30 June could have been U-1191.

References

Bibliography

External links

German Type VIIC submarines
1943 ships
U-boats commissioned in 1943
U-boats sunk in 1944
World War II submarines of Germany
Ships built in Hamburg
Maritime incidents in September 1943
Maritime incidents in June 1944
U-boats sunk by British warships
U-boats sunk by British aircraft
U-boats sunk by depth charges
Ships lost with all hands
World War II shipwrecks in the English Channel